Fraunie Fraunholz (1876–1938) was a Canadian film actor active during the silent era. He starred in a number of films directed by the pioneer Alice Guy.

Selected filmography
 Matrimony's Speed Limit (1913)
 The Pit and the Pendulum (1913)
 A House Divided (1913)
 Shadows of the Moulin Rouge (1913)
 The Lure (1914)
 The Temptations of Satan (1914)
 Her Own Way (1915)
 The Soul Market (1916)
 What Will People Say? (1916)
 The Thirteenth Chair (1919)

References

Bibliography
 Alison McMahan. Alice Guy Blaché: Lost Visionary of the Cinema. Bloomsbury Publishing, 2014.

External links

1876 births
1938 deaths
Canadian male film actors
Male actors from Alberta
Canadian emigrants to the United States